Macroglossum kleineri is a moth of the family Sphingidae which is endemic to Sulawesi.

References

kleineri
Moths described in 2006
Fauna of Sulawesi